The lac du Fou (lake crazy) is located in the municipality of Saint-Roch-de-Mékinac, in La Mauricie National Park, in the region Mauricie, in Quebec, in Canada. Located west of the Saint-Maurice River, this lake is surrounded by forest and is mainly used for outdoor activities by visitors of La Mauricie National Park.

Geography 

This lake supplies including the outlet of Lake Hamel, located north-east, and Lake Dion, located to the west. The mouth of the lake (Lac du Fou), located southeast of the lake empties into the "stream of crazy" which has a total length of 8.8 km (measured by water). It flows eastward across the lake Satchel, then Cutaway lake. From the mouth of the latest lake, creek runs 7 km (measured with water) before emptying into the Saint-Maurice River in Grandes-Piles and Saint-Roch-de-Mékinac.

The lake is 3.2 km long (measured by water) or 2.4 km (measured in a straight line). The lake is located 5.8 km (direct line) west of Saint-Maurice River.

The route of row 1 (eastbound) passes south of the lake.

Name 

This lake has a complex shape (in three parts) and very serpentine, like if it were designed by a crazy artist practicing abstract style.

References

See also 

 Lac de la tourbière (Lake Bog)
 Lake Gabet
 Lake Wapizagonke
 Laurentien Trail
 La Mauricie National Park
 Mekinac Regional County Municipality
 Saint-Roch-de-Mékinac

Fou
Mékinac Regional County Municipality